The World Champion (German: Der Weltmeister) is a 1919 German silent film directed by Erik Lund.

Cast
In alphabetical order
 Jo Conradt 
 Ria Jende 
 Bruno Kastner 
 Max Laurence 
 Rose Lichtenstein 
 Lotte Müller as Kind  
 Karl Platen 
 Toni Tetzlaff as Gräfin Aristo-Senkt

References

Bibliography
 Hans-Michael Bock and Tim Bergfelder. The Concise Cinegraph: An Encyclopedia of German Cinema. Berghahn Books.

External links

1919 films
Films of the Weimar Republic
German silent feature films
Films directed by Erik Lund
German black-and-white films
1910s German films